Rosalie Helga Lina Zech (7 July 1940 – 31 August 2011), known as Rosel Zech, was a German theater and film actress, especially with the "Autorenkino" (New German Cinema) movement, which began in the 1970s.

Career

Theater
Rose Zech was born in Berlin; her father was a citizen from Poland. Because of her birth out of wedlock, her mother, a dressmaker, married soon after the birth of her daughter an inland waterway boatman who gave her his last name, She was raised in Hoya, Germany. Her performing led her, at the age of 20, to Lower Bavaria, where in 1962 her first theatrical engagement was in the South Bavarian City Theater (now the Lower Bavarian State Theatre) in Landshut.

This was followed by other roles at various other theaters, such as in 1964 at the Städtebundtheater in Biel and at the summer theater in Winterthur. Two years later she played at the Schauspielhaus Wuppertal. From 1970 to 1972, she appeared on stage at the Staatstheater Stuttgart then at the Schauspielhaus Bochum.

During the season 1978–1979 Rosel Zech was active in Hamburg at the Deutsches Schauspielhaus and then returned to her native city of Berlin, where she acted on the Volksbühne. In 1981 she was hired by the Bayerischen Staatsschauspiel in Munich. Four years later she was seen again at the Schauspielhaus in Hamburg. 2009 she worked with in the Luisenburg Festival in the play Mother Courage as Anna Fierlinger.

Film and television
She made her 1970 television debut in The Pot. In 1973 she appeared in a small role in The Tenderness of Wolves with Kurt Raab and Margit Carstensen. On the set she met Rainer Werner Fassbinder, who produced the film. She and Fassbinder began an extended collaboration. The same year, Peter Zadek cast the actress in his film version of Kleiner Mann – was nun? ("Little man - what now?" with Heinrich Giskes and Hannelore Hoger.

Other films and TV movies followed, among which were a film version of Anton Chekhov's The Seagull, and Henrik Ibsen's Hedda Gabler. In the children's film  from 1977, she played Mrs. Wolferman, the mother of one of the "crocodiles". She appeared in Peter Fleischmann's 1979 science fiction film The Hamburg Syndrome.

In 1981, she was cast by Rainer Werner Fassbinder in the film Lola (1981) in a supporting role as the wife of Mario Adorf. Fassbinder immediately chose her for his next project, Veronika Voss, and cast her in the lead. This second Fassbinder film was inspired by the life of the UFA actress Sybille Schmitz, and Rosel Zech's convincing portrayal of the morphine-addicted actress turned Zech into a star overnight. The film was awarded in 1982 in the Berlin International Film Festival with a Golden Bear. In the following years, Zech focused mainly on work in television and appeared in numerous television series and television films, as well as in regular theater productions in Berlin, where she lived during her last years.  From 2002 until her death, she had a regular role as the mother superior in the German TV series Um Himmels Willen.

Death
She died of bone cancer in Berlin on 31 August 2011, aged 71.
Following a cancer diagnosis in the summer of 2011, Zech had not been able to resume her regular role as a nun in the German TV series Um Himmels Willen (For Heaven's Sake).

Awards
1968: Förderpreis des Landes Nordrhein-Westfalen
1976: Schauspielerin des Jahres der Zeitschrift Theater heute for Hedda Gabler
1982: Goldener Bär der Berlinale for Die Sehnsucht der Veronika Voss
1983: Deutscher Darstellerpreis for Mascha
1990: Kainz-Medaille der Stadt Wien for Eines langen Tages Reise in die Nacht
1991: 1. Preis des World Film Festival in Montreal for Salmonberries
1992: Bayerischer Filmpreis (Beste Darstellerin) for Salmonberries
1999: Bayerischer Verdienstorden
2001: Merkur-Theaterpreis der Zeitung Münchner Merkur for Afterplay

Filmography 

1970: Der Pott (TV movie, directed by Peter Zadek), as Susi
1973: The Tenderness of Wolves (directed by Ulli Lommel), as Dame an der Tür
1973: Little Man, What Now? (TV movie, directed by Peter Zadek), as Marlene Dietrich / Marie Kleinholtz / Bettlerkind / Frau Nothnagel / Claire Waldoff
1974: Mädchen in Uniform (TV movie), as Frau von Bernburg
1974: The Seagull (TV movie, directed by Peter Zadek), as Nina Michailowna Saretschnaja
1974: Ice Age (directed by Peter Zadek), as Wanda
1977: Die Geisel (TV movie, directed by Peter Zadek), as Mrs. Gilchrist
1977:  (TV movie, directed by Wolfgang Becker), as Frau Wolfermann
1978: Hedda Gabler (TV movie, directed by Peter Zadek), as Hedda Gabler
1978: Verführungen (TV movie, directed by Michael Verhoeven), as Christine
1979: The Hamburg Syndrome (directed by Peter Fleischmann), as Dr. Hamm
1980:  (directed by Tankred Dorst), as Adele
1980: The Misanthrope (TV movie, directed by Peter Zadek), as Célimène
1981:  (TV movie, directed by Peter Keglevic), as Herlinde
1981: Der Nächste bitte (TV Movie)
1981: Lola (directed by Rainer Werner Fassbinder), as Frau Schuckert
1981: Heute spielen wir den Boss / Wo geht's denn hier zum Film? (directed by Peer Raben), as Frau Kaiser
1981: Die Knapp-Familie (TV miniseries) as Elfriede Knapp
1982: Veronika Voss (directed by Rainer Werner Fassbinder), as Veronika Voss
1983: Mascha (TV movie)
1982:  (TV miniseries, directed by Egon Monk), as Lieselotte Oppermann
1983: Klawitter (TV movie, directed by Günter Gräwert), as Elli Hoff
1984: Julia (TV movie, directed by Wolfgang Glück), as Julia Lambert
1985: Tatort (Episode: "Der Mord danach"), as Jutta Reismüller
1985: Der Angriff der Gegenwart auf die übrige Zeit (directed by Alexander Kluge), as Ärztin
1986:  (TV movie, directed by Peter Beauvais), as Sabine Halm
1986: The Old Fox (Episode: "Blutgoldspur") as Helma Köhler
1986: Betrogene Liebe (TV movie) as Agnes
1986: Vermischte Nachrichten (directed by Alexander Kluge), as Erfolgstyp
1987: Nebel im Fjord (TV movie), as Claudia Busch
1987: Herz mit Löffel
1987: Die Bombe (TV movie), as Helga Meyerdiercks
1987: The Old Fox (Episode: "Verwischte Spuren"), as Gabriele Lohmann
1987: The Old Fox (Episode: "Mord ist Mord"), as Ingrid Pohl
1988: Die Bertinis (TV miniseries, directed by Egon Monk), as Erika Schwarz
1988: Hemingway (TV miniseries, directed by Bernhard Sinkel), as Lilli Marleen
1989:  (TV miniseries), as Felicitas Frey
1989: The Old Fox (Episode: "Ausgestiegen") as Jutta Sander
1990:  as Frau Berger
1991: Salmonberries (directed by Percy Adlon), as Roswitha
1993:  (directed by Sönke Wortmann), as Mrs. Neuhaus
1993: Derrick (Episode: "Nach acht langen Jahren") as Charlotte Heine
1993: Der rote Vogel (TV Mini-Series) as Ellen Vondrowski
1994: Polizeiruf 110 (Episode: "Gespenster") as Mutter Reiser
1994: Das Baby der schwangeren Toten (TV Movie) as Betti Ley
1995: Hades
1995: Schade um Papa (TV Series) as Lena Bandmann
1995: Dicke Freunde (TV Movie) as Marianne Strauß
1995: Neben der Zeit (TV Movie) as Sophies Mutter
1996: : Die indische Ärztin (TV Series) as Dr. Karla Fasching-Spiehweg
1996: Die Geliebte (TV Series)
1997: Lea Katz – Die Kriminalpsychologin (Episode: "Das wilde Kind") as Gisela Straub
1997: Terror im Namen der Liebe (TV Movie) as Elke
1997: Die letzte Rettung (TV Movie) as Gudrun
1998: Der Schlüssel (Short) as Reinigungschefin
1998: Tatort (Episode: "Der zweite Mann") as Juwelierin
1998: Tatort (Episode: "Todesbote") as Silvia Blankenberg
1999: Aimée & Jaguar as Blonde Frau
1999: Siska (Episode: "Blackout") as Dr. Beate Paulus
1999: The Old Fox (Episode: "Im Angesicht des Todes") as Judith Bennesch
1999: Morgen gehört der Himmel dir (TV Movie, directed by Ute Wieland) as Frau Niering
1999: Ein Fall für zwei (Episode: "Abgebrüht") as Klara Schierer
2000: Oh, du Fröhliche (TV Movie), as Irmela Kapp
2001: Ein unmöglicher Mann (TV Mini-Series) as Frau Schmitt-Oedenthal
2001: Große Liebe wider Willen (TV Movie) as Claudia
2001: Das Schneeparadies (TV Movie) as Margot
2002: Im Visier der Zielfahnder (Episode: "Die Frau ohne Namen") as Britta Prahm
2002:  (directed by Dani Levy), as Melanies Mutter
2002: Zwei Affären und eine Hochzeit (TV Movie) as Rosa Richter
2002–2011: Um Himmels Willen (TV Series, 130 episodes) as Oberin Elisabeth Reuter (final appearance)
2003: Anatomie 2 as Dr. Bamberg
2003: Tatort (Episode: "Veras Waffen") as Marion von Pahl
2003: Der Auftrag - Mordfall in der Heimat (TV Movie) as Karin Eisner
2003: Plötzlich wieder 16 (TV Movie) as Professorin
2003: Stubbe – Von Fall zu Fall (Episode: "Yesterday") as Dorothee Mewes
2004: Tatort (Episode: "Mörderspiele") as Monika Hanke-Helmhövel
2004: Kammerflimmern as Oma Crash
2004: The Old Fox (Episode: "Tod im Morgengrauen") as Gisela von Lindow
2005: Rosamunde Pilcher (Episode: "Segel der Liebe") as Winona Carter
2005: K3 – Kripo Hamburg (Episode: "Fieber") as Pauline Petersen
2005: In Liebe eine Eins (TV Movie) as Ursula Sandrock
2006:  (TV Series) as Mutter Martha
2006: Mr. Nanny – Ein Mann für Mama (TV Movie) as Marlene Meister
2006: Agathe kann's nicht lassen (Episode: "Die Tote im Bootshaus"") as Katharina Meindl
2008: Das Traumschiff (Episode: "Kilimandscharo - Malediven - Indien") as Kathrin Kriegel
2008: Einsatz in Hamburg (Episode: "Ein sauberer Mord") as Doris Blank
2008–2009: Der Schwarzwaldhof (TV Series) as Dora Hofer
2009:  (TV miniseries, directed by Ute Wieland) as Alma Sattler
2011: Schicksalsjahre (TV Series) as Martha Engler

References

External links 
Official Website of Rosel Zech
 Demo tape of Rosel Zech at schauspielervideos.de
 
 
Rosel Zech on www.prisma-online.de
Rosel Zech on  www.zdf.de
New York Times obituary

1942 births
2011 deaths
German film actresses
German stage actresses
German television actresses
20th-century German actresses
Actresses from Berlin
Deaths from cancer in Germany
Deaths from bone cancer